The Belogradchik rebellion broke out in the Belogradchik nahiya, part of the Ottoman Empire, on 6 August 1836, and lasted for 4–5 days. It was planned in Knjaževac (formerly Gurgusovac) in the Principality of Serbia and included participants from Serbia. That year there were also rebellions in nearby Pirot and in Berkovitsa.

References

Sources

August 1836 events
Bulgarian rebellions
Ottoman period in the history of Bulgaria
19th-century rebellions
Conflicts in 1836
Rebellions against the Ottoman Empire
1836 in the Ottoman Empire